Three Faces of Sin is a 1961 French language motion picture comedy directed by François Villiers, based on novel by Jean-Jaques Gauthier. The music score is by Maurice Jarre. The film stars Michèle Morgan, Jean-Claude Brialy, Catherine Spaak and Scilla Gabel.

It tells the story of a painter who parts from his mistress and marries her daughter.

Principal cast
Michèle Morgan  as Renee Plege  
Jean-Claude Brialy as Laurent  
Catherine Spaak  as Daniele Plege  
Michel Etcheverry  as Inspector  
Scilla Gabel  as Rossana  
Franco Fabrizi  as Guerbois

External links

1961 films
French comedy films
1960s French-language films
Films directed by François Villiers
1960s French films